Babic sausages are a Romanian sausage made from beef and pork and strongly seasoned with spices.
The original recipe contains pork and beef and has Slavic origins (Serbian and Bulgarian). It usually has a reddish color due to ingredients (spices) and is similar to ghiudem sausage.

See also

 List of sausages

References 

Romanian sausages